Lissotesta micra, common name the tiny false top shell, is a species of sea snail, a marine gastropod mollusk, unassigned in the superfamily Seguenzioidea.

Description
The shell grows to a height of 1.3 mm.

Distribution
This marine species occurs off Tasmania and off New South Wales, Australia.

References

External links
 To World Register of Marine Species
 
 Seashells of New South Wales: Lissotesta micra
 Molluscs of Tasmania: Lissotesta micra

micra
Gastropods described in 1876